A lug is a typically flattened protuberance, a handle or extrusion located on the side of a ceramics, jug, glass, vase, or other container. They are sometimes found on prehistoric ceramics and stone containers, such as on pots from ancient Egypt, Hembury ware, claw beakers, and boar spears.

A lug may also only be shaped as a lip for suspension–(no hole). In Ancient Egypt, lugs contained a hole for suspension, with 2– or 3–lugged vessels most common.

In Roman times, lugs were on some types of column-sections to aid in construction. After slung by rope into position with a crane, the lugs were then masoned off.

In Japan, Iga ware vases with lugs on each side are called "ears" and are an important feature.

See also
Package handle

References

External links
Ancient Egypt stone pot, with suspending hole lugs. Click on picture.
Stone pot, with suspending hole lugs. Click on picture.
Pottery vessel from Predynastic Egypt. Suspension 'handles'. Click on picture.

Pottery